The Liberty Flames football statistical leaders are individual statistical leaders of the Liberty Flames football program in various categories, including passing, rushing, receiving, total offense, all-purpose yardage, defensive stats, and kicking. Within those areas, the lists identify single-game, single-season, and career leaders. The Flames represent Liberty University as an independent in NCAA Division I FBS.

Liberty began competing in intercollegiate football in 1973, when the school was known as Lynchburg Baptist College and was affiliated with the National Christian College Athletic Association. The program gained full varsity status in 1975, the same year in which the school became Liberty Baptist College and joined the NAIA. In 1980, the school joined NCAA Division II, while maintaining its NAIA membership; it left the NAIA in 1983. Two years later, the current name of Liberty University was adopted. The program moved to Division I FCS (known before the 2006 season as Division I-AA) in 1988, remaining at that level through the 2017 season. Just prior to that season, Liberty began a transition to FBS; it was classified as an FBS member for scheduling purposes in 2018 and became a full FBS member in 2019.

Since Liberty started its football program in 1973, full box scores are available for all games, and there is no pre-modern era with incomplete statistics like there is for many college football teams. Additionally, freshmen have been eligible to play on varsity teams during Liberty's entire football history, giving all players who started their college careers at that school the chance to play for four seasons.

At levels of play below FBS, regular seasons have been shorter than the FBS limit—currently 11 games as opposed to 12 for FBS. However, all levels of play below FBS hold official championship tournaments, providing the opportunity for more games. That said, playoff games are not necessarily included in official statistics maintained by national governing bodies—for example, the NCAA did not include playoff games in official I-AA/FCS statistics until 2002, the same year in which it first included bowl games in official FBS statistics. Additionally, the NCAA allows FCS programs to schedule 12 regular-season games in years when the period starting with the Thursday before Labor Day and ending with the final Saturday in November contains 14 Saturdays. Liberty was thus able to play a 12-game schedule in 2008, 2013, and 2014. Finally, Liberty has played in (and won) the Cure Bowl in both seasons since completing its FBS transition (2019 and 2020).

These lists are updated through Liberty's game against Middle Tennessee on October 9, 2021.

While Liberty produces a football media guide, it does not make it available as a single volume on its official athletic website. Instead, it publishes separate lists of career, single-season, and single-game leaders in all relevant categories. Unlike many FBS schools, it generally lists only the top 5 on all relevant leaderboards. This article will generally follow Liberty's current practice, with differences as noted in each section. Leaderboards are also expanded beyond the top 5 wherever performances from 2020 or later qualify for top-5 places.

Passing
Liberty lists all 250-yard passing performances on its official athletic site, allowing a full single-game top 10 for yards to be compiled. It also lists all 3,000-yard seasons in school history, making the single-season list a top 6 instead of a top 5.

Passing yards

Passing touchdowns

Rushing
Liberty's list of single-season rushing leaders includes all 1,000-yard rushing seasons (16 to date), allowing a full top 10 to be compiled. The program also lists all 100-yard rushing games on its official athletic site, allowing a full single-game top 10 for yards to be compiled.

Rushing yards

Rushing touchdowns

Receiving

Receptions

Receiving yards
Liberty includes all 1,000-yard seasons in its official leaderboards, resulting in a top 9 single-season list instead of a top 5. The program also lists all 100-yard receiving games on its official athletic site, allowing a full single-game top 10 for yards to be compiled.

Receiving touchdowns

Total offense
Total offense is the sum of passing and rushing statistics. It does not include receiving or returns.

Total offense yards
Liberty lists all instances of 250 yards of total offense in a game on its official athletic site, allowing a full single-game top 10 to be compiled. The program's lists of total offense leaders do not break down leaders' performances by type of play (passing or rushing). However, these breakdowns can be extrapolated for all performances in the top 10 of the single-game list, as well as most of the career and single-season leaders, using totals from other statistical lists available on the program website.

Touchdowns responsible for
"Touchdowns responsible for" is the official NCAA term for combined passing and rushing touchdowns. Liberty does not list single-game leaders.

All-purpose yardage
All-purpose yardage is the sum of all yards credited to a player who is in possession of the ball. It includes rushing, receiving, and returns, but does not include passing.

Liberty does not break down its leaders' performances over any time frame (career, season, game) by type of play.

Defense

Interceptions

Tackles

Sacks

Kicking
Liberty does not list field goal percentage leaders over any time frame on its athletics site.

Field goals made

References

Liberty